
Gmina Lubycza Królewska is a rural gmina (administrative district) in Tomaszów Lubelski County, Lublin Voivodeship, in eastern Poland, on the border with Ukraine.

The gmina contains part of the protected area called South Roztocze Landscape Park.

Villages
Gmina Lubycza Królewska contains the villages and settlements of Brzeziny, Bukowinka, Dęby, Gruszka, Hrebenne, Hrebenne-Osada, Huta Lubycka, Jalinka, Kniazie, Kornie, Łazowa, Lubycza Królewska, Mosty Małe, Mrzygłody Lubyckie, Myślatyn, Nowe Dyniska, Nowosiółki Kardynalskie, Nowosiółki Przednie, Nowy Machnów, Pawliszcze, Potoki, Ruda Lubycka, Ruda Żurawiecka, Ruda Żurawiecka-Osada, Rudki, Siedliska, Stary Machnów, Szalenik, Teniatyska, Wierzbica, Wólka Wierzbicka, Zatyle, Zatyle-Osada, Żurawce and Żurawce-Osada.

Neighbouring gminas
Gmina Lubycza Królewska is bordered by the gminas of Bełżec, Horyniec-Zdrój, Jarczów, Narol, Tomaszów Lubelski and Ulhówek. It also borders Ukraine.

References

Polish official population figures 2006

Lubycza Krolewska
Tomaszów Lubelski County